Hugo Leufvenius (born March 26, 1999) is a Swedish professional ice hockey centre currently playing for Karlskrona HK of HockeyAllsvenskan.

Leufvenius played two games in the Swedish Hockey League for Linköpings HC during the 2016–17 SHL season. He also played two seasons in the Ontario Hockey League for the Sarnia Sting.

References

External links

1999 births
Living people
Karlskrona HK players
Linköping HC players
Sarnia Sting players
Ice hockey people from Stockholm
Swedish ice hockey centres